Alessio Erardi (1669–1727) was a Maltese painter. He was the son of the artist Stefano Erardi and his wife Caterina Buttigieg. He initially studied art with his father, and eventually spent five and a half years in Rome between 1695 and 1701. His style is regarded as an early form of Baroque, and he was influenced by both his father and Mattia Preti.

Selected works by Alessio Erardi include:
Our Lady of Sorrows, Collegiate Church of Saint Lawrence, Vittoriosa
Our Lady with St John the Baptist, Collegiate Church of the Immaculate Conception, Bormla
Our Lady of the Holy Rosary (1702), Our Saviour's Church, Lija
Count Roger (1713), St. Paul's Cathedral, Mdina
Our Lady of the Rosary, Sanctuary of Our Lady of Mellieħa (attributed)
Our Lady with the Child Jesus and Souls in Purgatory, Parish Church of the Assumption, Mosta
Our Lady of Graces, Parish Church of Our Lady of Graces, Żabbar
various paintings at the Church of Our Lady of Victories, Valletta
various paintings at the oratory of the Church of the Jesuits, Valletta
ceiling of the Oratory of the Blessed Sacrament, Basilica of St Dominic, Valletta
ceiling of the Church of St. Ursola, Valletta
Grand Master Raymond Perellos and Pope Clement XI, Saint John's Co-Cathedral, Valletta

References

1669 births
1727 deaths
17th-century Maltese painters
18th-century Maltese painters
18th-century male artists
People from Valletta
Baroque painters
Maltese artists